Indonesia is a country located close to tectonic plate boundaries which causes it to have many active faults and is prone to earthquakes,

Sumatra 
Great Sumatran Fault

Samalanga-Sipopok Fault

Mentawai Fault

Java 
Citarik Fault

Cimandiri Fault

Baribis Fault

Cirata Fault

Cugenang Fault

Lembang Fault

Southern Garut Fault

Citanduy Fault

Kendeng Fault

Ajibarang Fault

Merapi-Merbabu Fault

Opak Fault

Pati Fault

Muria Fault

Rawapening Fault

Kaligarang Fault

Rembang-Madura-Kangean-Sakala Fault

Grindulu Fault

Borneo 
Tarakan Fault

Meratus Fault

Adang-Partenoster Fault

Sulawesi 
Palu-Koro Fault

Matano Fault

Lawanopo Fault

Gorontalo Fault

Kolaka Fault

Walanae Fault

Balantak Fault

Mamuju Thrust Fault

Saddang Fault

Lesser Sunda Islands 
Flores Back Arc Thrust Fault

Bondowatu Fault

Maluku Islands 
Banda Detachment

Sorong Fault

Kawa Fault

Papua 
Mamberamo Fault

Main Jayawijaya Thrust Fault

Lengguru Fault

Tarera-Aiduna Fault

Yapen Fault

Ransiki Fault

Subduction Zone 
Sunda megathrust

North Sulawesi Trench

Philippine Trench

Timor Trough

Seram Trough

New Guinea Trench

See also 
List of earthquakes in Indonesia
Geology of Indonesia
Indo-Australian Plate
Eurasian Plate
Pacific Plate
Seismicity of the Sumatra coast

References 

 
faults in Indonesia